Spitshine is the third studio album by Australian hip hop artist and member of The Herd, Urthboy.  It was released on 28 August 2009.

Overview 
The album was shortlisted for the 2009 Australian Music Prize, the second time Urthboy has been nominated, with The Signal being nominated in 2007.

The first song lifted from the album was "Hellsong", was released as a free download from Urthboy's official website, in May 2009. The video for the song is composed of more than 7,000 hand-drawn images and animated in Sydney, Christchurch, London, Hungary and Oslo.  It was directed by Brendan Doyle and produced by Navid Bahadori, for Broken Yellow.  Broken Yellow were also the production company behind The Herd's video "I Was Only Nineteen". The video was selected as 'Indie Clip on the Week' on Rage.  The second single, "Ready to Go", was released 17 July 2009.  The video for which was directed by James Hackett and produced by Kala Ellis from Hackett Films. The video for a third song, "Shruggin", featuring Jane Tyrell (also a member of The Herd), was released in November 2009.

Track listing

Charts

References

2009 albums
Urthboy albums